Constance Palgrave Abraham,  (12 May 1864 – 3 October 1942) was a New Zealand community leader and sportswoman. She was born in Palgrave, Suffolk, England in 1864. In June 1890 at Long Melford, she married Lionel Abraham from Palmerston North in New Zealand; he had emigrated some time earlier. After their wedding, they lived in Palmerston North.

Abraham competed as an equestrian, in tennis and in golf.

References

1864 births
1942 deaths
British emigrants to New Zealand
New Zealand Members of the Order of the British Empire
New Zealand female equestrians
People from Mid Suffolk District
New Zealand female golfers
New Zealand female tennis players